Touchdown Tournament was an American football league composed of teams from different Brazilian states. The league format was developed by the leaders Flavio "Skin" Cardia of the Fluminense Imperadores, and Mario Lewandowski of the São Paulo Storm, who chaired the Steering Committee of the League. The project was presented to the public during the Tournament Selections AFAB in April 2009, by signing a statement of commitment by the representatives of the 10 teams involved. Eight of the 10 teams declared themselves able to participate in the Touchdown Tournament in 2009.

In 2010, most teams who competed in the league left in 2009, after the end of the season, to create the Liga Brasileira de Futebol Americano (LBFA) due to differences with the commissioner Andrew Joseph Adler, who held the right to use the Torneio Touchdown name.

However, in 2013, some teams returned to Torneio Touchdown, raising the number of participating teams to 20, the highest since the creation of the league.

The league dissolved in 2016

Teams

Current teams (2013)

Former teams
Barigüi Crocodiles (2009)
Cuiabá Arsenal (2009)
Curitiba Brown Spiders (2009)
Joinville Gladiators (2009)
Rio de Janeiro Imperadores (2009)
Sorocaba Vipers (2009)
São José Istepôs (2010)
São Paulo Spartans (2010)
Ribeirao Preto Challengers (2011-2013)

See also
AFAB
Brazil national American football team

References

External links
 Página Oficial do Torneio Touchdown
 Site da NFL Brasil

American football in Brazil
American football leagues
2008 establishments in Brazil
Sports leagues established in 2008